Tower of Spite is the second album by Cerebral Fix – a thrash metal band from Birmingham, England. It was released in 1990 on Roadrunner Records and follows the independent label release of Life Sucks... And Then You Die! in 1988. A third album, again on Roadrunner Records appeared a year later, succinctly titled Bastards.

A Tower of Spite demo was given to Roadrunner Records before the band recorded the final release and when the label agreed to sign them, they did a two-night supporting stint of Sepultura at The Marquee in London. Following the album's release, the band toured with Napalm Death – who later returned the favour by appearing in a guest capacity on their last album, Death Erotica.

Overview
The DIY skate/thrash/grindcore approach of the previous outing had been consigned to history and the band started afresh with an effort which was more composed, both musically and in terms of production quality – as would be expected from a switch to a major label. Two line-up changes – ex-Sacrilege members, Frank Healy and Andy Baker – ensured that the band kept up with the changes technically.

Track listing
All songs written by Cerebral Fix
"Unity For Who?" – 1:44
"Enter the Turmoil" – 3:20
"Feast of the Fools" – 5:08
"Chasten of Fear" – 3:32
"Circle of the Earth" – 3:50
"Tower of Spite" – 4:01
"Injecting Out" – 3:30
"Quest For Midian" – 5:41
"Forgotten Genocide" – 2:54
"Culte des Mortes (Part 1)" – 5:50
"Closing Irony (Hidden Track)" – 4:27

Credits
 Simon Forrest – vocals
 Tony Warburton – guitar
 Gregg Fellows – guitar
 Frank Healy – bass
 Andy Baker – drums
 Recorded in June – August, 1990 at Rhythm Studios, Leamington Spa, England
 Produced, engineered, and mixed by Paul Johnson
 Cover illustrations by Mark Lyden

References

External links
Encyclopaedia Metallum album entry

1990 albums
Cerebral Fix albums